Bruno Zapelli (born 17 May 2002) is an Italian-Argentine footballer currently playing as a midfielder for Belgrano.

Club career
Born in Carlos Paz, Córdoba, Zapelli was spotted at the age of eleven by Spanish side Villarreal while trialling in Rosario. After almost three years in Spain, he returned to Argentina and trialled with Boca Juniors. However, when the club could not provide a place for him to stay, he returned to Córdoba to join Belgrano.

In 2022, Zapelli was subject to a $2,000,000 bid from Italian club Modena, which was rejected by Belgrano.

Personal life
Born in Argentina, Zapelli is of Italian descent and holds both citizenships.

Career statistics

Club

References

2002 births
Living people
People from Córdoba, Argentina
Argentine footballers
Argentine people of Italian descent
Association football midfielders
Primera Nacional players
Villarreal CF players
Club Atlético Belgrano footballers
Argentine expatriate footballers
Argentine expatriate sportspeople in Spain
Expatriate footballers in Spain